Venpakal is a village in Thiruvananthapuram district in the state of Kerala, India.

Location
Venpakal is about 5 km away from the town of Neyyattinkara on the Kamukinkode-Nellimoodu road.

Politics
Venpakal village is part of Athiyannur, Thiruvananthapuram Grama Panchayath.
It comes under Neyyattinkara Assembly constituency and Thiruvananthapuram (Lok Sabha constituency).

List of Hospitals
Government Community Health Centre, Venpakal

Educational Institutions
Government LPBS, Venpakal 

Government LPGS, Venpakal

Transport
By Rail

Venpakal is about 20 km from Thiruvananthapuram Central Railway Station and 6 km from the Neyyattinkara Railway Station.

By Bus

Buses from KSRTC Central Bus Station Thiruvananthapuram and Neyyattinkara Bus depot operate to Venpakal.

By Air

The nearest airport is Trivandrum International Airport, 25 km away.

References

Villages in Thiruvananthapuram district